UA120 was a family of American solid rocket boosters, manufactured by the Chemical Systems Division of United Aircraft (later United Technologies Corporation). Several variants existed, with a varying number of segments.

Design

All versions of UA120 shared a common design, with the only significant differentiating factor being the length of the motor. It was a segmented design, with between five and seven motor segments possible. A solid propellant, polybutadiene acrylonitrile (PBAN), was used as fuel. The stage had an external diameter of 120 inches. Attitude control in flight was provided by means of a liquid injection thrust vector control (LITVC) system, with an external nacelle containing nitrogen tetroxide attached to the side of each booster. Solid fueled separation rockets, used to jettison the spent boosters, were affixed at the top and bottom of the stage. Thrust-termination capability, necessary for manned rockets such as the Space Shuttle or Manned Orbiting Laboratory, was to be provided by two pyrotechnically triggered ports on the forward closure, which when opened would allow for the non-propulsive venting of exhaust gasses. The forward end of the stage contained an aerodynamic nose cone, an ignitor, separation rockets, and the forward attachment ring. The aft end contained additional separation rockets, the nozzle, and a heat shield.

Variants
The overall design of each variant was very similar, the main difference being the number of segments used. This is indicated by the number at the end of each designation.

UA1205
UA1205 was used as a strap-on booster on the Titan IIIC, Titan IIID, and Titan IIIE rockets, and was proposed for use on several derivatives of the Saturn rocket family.

UA1206
The UA1206 was used as a strap-on booster on Titan 34D and Commercial Titan III.

UA1207
UA1207 was used on Titan IV-A. It was proposed for several other variants of Titan III and IV, as well as derivatives of the Saturn rocket family and the Space Shuttle.

References

Solid-fuel rockets